The 2022 Dutch Boy 150 was the fourth stock car race of the 2022 ARCA Menards Series season, and the third iteration of the event. The race was held on Saturday, May 14, 2022, in Kansas City, Kansas at Kansas Speedway, a 1.5 mile (4 km) permanent oval-shaped racetrack. The race was contested over 100 laps. At race's end, Nick Sanchez, driving for Rev Racing, would take the win, after holding off teammate Rajah Caruth in the final 36 laps. This was Sanchez's third career ARCA Menards Series win, and his second of the season. To fill out the podium, Daniel Dye of GMS Racing would finish 3rd, respectively.

Background 
Kansas Speedway is a  tri-oval race track in the Village West area near Kansas City, Kansas, United States. It was built in 2001 and it currently hosts two annual NASCAR race weekends. The IndyCar Series also held races at the venue until 2011. The speedway is owned and operated by NASCAR.

Entry list 

 (R) denotes rookie driver

 **Withdrew prior to the event.

Practice/Qualifying 
Practice and qualifying was combined into one 45-minute session, with a driver's fastest time counting as their qualifying lap. It was held on Saturday, May 14, at 9:45 AM CST.

Race results

Standings after the race 

Drivers' Championship standings

Note: Only the first 10 positions are included for the driver standings.

References 

2022 ARCA Menards Series
NASCAR races at Kansas Speedway
Dutch Boy 150
2022 in sports in Kansas